Wycombe Wanderers Football Club is an English association football club based in the town of High Wycombe, Buckinghamshire. Founded in 1887 as an amateur club, the team entered the FA Amateur Cup for the first time in 1894–95, made their FA Cup debut the following season, and joined the Southern League in 1896. They played in the Second Division of the Southern League until 1908, when after twice finishing bottom of that league, the club declined the invitation to continue membership and opted for the amateur Great Western Suburban League instead. When competitive football resumed after the First World War they spent two seasons in the Spartan Leaguewinning the title on each occasionbefore being accepted into the Isthmian League, in which they spent the remainder of the inter-war period. They finished third in 1930–31, but the highlight of the season was victory in the Amateur Cup. In the final, held at Arsenal's Highbury Stadium, Wycombe beat Hayes 1–0 to win the trophy for the first and only time. The goal was scored by Alf Britnell after 81 minutes. Between 1953–54 and 1959–60, Wycombe never finished outside the top four in the Isthmian League. They won the championship for the first time in 1955–56, retained the title in 1956–57, and reached the Amateur Cup Final that same year. This time, they lost 3–1 in front of a crowd of 90,000 at Wembley Stadium as Bishop Auckland won their third consecutive Amateur Cup.

At the start of the 1970s, Wycombe won the Isthmian League four times in five seasons. The fourth of those titles, in 1974–75, was in the first season after the distinction between amateur and professional was abolished, so Wycombe made their first appearance in the FA Trophy, which until then had been open to non-League clubs that registered professional players. They also reached the third round of the FA Cup for the first time; they held First Division leaders Middlesbrough to a goalless draw at Loakes Park, and only lost the replay to a last-minute goal. Courtesy of the Isthmian League win, they were invited to enter the Anglo-Italian Semi-Professional Trophy, a match played on a home-and-away basis against Monza, winners of the Coppa Italia Semiprofessionisti. Wycombe lost the away leg 1–0 but won 2–0 at home to take the trophy.

Wycombe's continued success in the Isthmian League brought potential promotion to the Alliance Premier League, the level immediately below the Football League. The club twice refused the opportunity before accepting for the 1985–86 season. They finished 20th, and were relegated on goal difference, but thanks to their eighth Isthmian League title, made an immediate return to the higher level, which had been renamed the Football Conference. Under the management of Martin O'Neill, Wycombe won the FA Trophy for the first time in 1991, beating Kidderminster Harriers at Wembley in front of a then record attendance for the competition of 34,842. They followed up with runners-up spot in the 1991–92 season and went one better in 1992–93, adding a second FA Trophy to the Conference title and consequent promotion to the Football League.

They marked their debut season in the Football League with promotion to the Second Division via the play-offs; after a fourth-place finish, they beat Carlisle United in the semi-final and came from 2–1 down to beat Preston North End 4–2 in the final. After eight seasons in the third tier, they were relegated, and thereafter moved regularly between the two lower tiers. In 2013–14, they avoided a return to the Conference only on goal difference, but bounced back to reach the play-off final the following year, only to lose to Southend United in a penalty shoot-out. In 2017–18, they were promoted back to League One and two years later they reached the second tier of English football for the first time in their history after beating Oxford United 2–1 in the play-off final. Although they lost their first seven matches of the 2020–21 EFL Championship, and were 12 points adrift in mid-February, they recovered to finish 22nd and their relegation was only confirmed on the final day of the season. They reached the play-off final the following year but were beaten 2–0 by Sunderland.

Wycombe reached the FA Cup semi-final for the first time in 2000–01; they had not previously passed the third round. They held Liverpool, holders of the 2000–01 League Cup and still in that season's UEFA Cup, for 78 minutes before goals from Emile Heskey and Robbie Fowler secured a place in the final for the Premier League club; Keith Ryan made the score 2–1. In the Football League Cup, Wycombe eliminated two Premier League clubs, Fulham and Charlton Athletic, on their way to the 2006–07 semi-final; they drew with Chelsea in the home leg, but lost 4–0 at Stamford Bridge.

Since their admission to the Football League, Wycombe have spent 13 seasons in the fourth tier of the English football league system, 15 in the third tier, and 1 in the second. The table details the team's achievements and the top goalscorer in senior first-team competitions from their debut season in the FA Amateur Cup in 1894–95 to the end of the most recently completed season.

Key

Key to league record:
Pld – Matches played
W – Matches won
D – Matches drawn
L – Matches lost
GF – Goals for
GA – Goals against
Pts – Points
Pos – Final position

Key to divisions:
South 2 – Southern League Second Division
South 2L – Southern League Second Division London Section
B&B – Berks and Bucks League
BCC – Bucks and Contiguous Counties League
GWSL – Great Western Suburban League
Spartan – Spartan League
Isthmian – Isthmian League
Isth 1 – Isthmian League Division One
Isth P – Isthmian League Premier Division
APL – Alliance Premier League
Conf – Football Conference
Div 3 – Football League Third Division
Div 4 – Football League Fourth Division
League 1 – Football League One, EFL League One
League 2 – Football League Two, EFL League Two
Champ – EFL Championship

Key to rounds:
ExPre – Extra preliminary round
Prelim –  Preliminary round
QR1 – First qualifying round
QR2 – Second qualifying round, etc.
Inter – Intermediate round (between qualifying rounds and rounds proper)
R1 – First round
R2 – Second round, etc.
QF – Quarter-final
3rd – Third place
SF – Semi-final
F – Final
W – Winners
(S) – Southern section of regionalised stage
Scr – Scratched

Details of abandoned competitions – the 1939–40 FA Cup and Isthmian League – are shown in italics and appropriately footnoted.

Seasons

Notes

References

External links
Wycombe Wanderers F.C. official website
British Pathé footage of 1957 FA Amateur Cup Final

Seasons
 
Wycombe Wanderers